Karlson Creek is a fork of Rheem Creek in Richmond, California.

Overview
The stream runs from the Hilltop neighborhood through the city's northern hills to its confluence with Rheen Creek alongside the Richmond Country Club. It then runs to San Pablo Bay through Parchester Village and Giant and Breuner marshes.

See also
 List of watercourses in the San Francisco Bay Area

References

Rivers of Contra Costa County, California
Bodies of water of Richmond, California
Rivers of Northern California
Tributaries of Rheem Creek